Marjorie Lissette de Sousa Rivas (born 23 April 1980) is a Venezuelan actress, model, and singer of Portuguese descent. She is known worldwide for her villainous roles in telenovelas.

Career

1999–2009: Beginnings and notable roles
At age 12, De Sousa began her career doing television commercials and working as a model. In 1999, she entered the beauty pageant Miss Venezuela in the hands of the famous Venezuelan designer Giovanni Scutaro. A year later, she worked on her first telenovela, Amantes de luna llena, which was produced and broadcast by the television channel Venevisión. In 2001, she co-starred in the hit telenovela Guerra de mujeres, with the character Carolina, one of the most popular in the plot.

In 2002, De Sousa left Venezuela to work on the telenovela Gata salvaje, a co-production of Venevisión and the Spanish-American channel Univision. In this internationally acclaimed novel, she plays Camelia Valente, an antagonist in which she has perhaps been one of her best characters, achieving her international projection. At the end of that production, De Sousa went to work on the Mexican telenovela Mariana de la noche, produced by Televisa; there her character had the name of Carol, also as an antagonist. Next, she worked on another successful Univision telenovela called Rebeca, where she had the character of Gisela, another role where she acted as an antagonist.

In 2005, she starred in the telenovela Ser bonita no basta of the TV network Radio Caracas Televisión (RCTV). A year later she returned to star in another telenovela of RCTV, Y los declaro marido y mujer, a beach production set in Venezuela's Margarita Island. In 2007, De Sousa began to work in the cast of the telenovela Amor comprado, produced by Venevisión; with a character as villain of the plot called Margot. Two years later, she becomes the antagonist of the telenovela Pecadora next to Eduardo Capetillo and Litzy where she began to have skills as a singer interpreting the theme of her character and the protagonist.

2010–present: Critical success in telenovelas
In 2010, De Sousa appeared in Sacrificio de mujer, alongside Luis José Santander and its directed by Adriana Barraza. In 2011, she played an antagonist in a special participation in Corazón apasionado alongside Guy Ecker and Marlene Favela. That same year she starred in the new video of the song "Poquito a Poquito" by Henry Santos, former member of American bachata group Aventura. In films, she participated in the films Duelos de pasarela and Soltera y sin compromiso.

In 2012, she made her theatrical debut at Toc Toc, a world-renowned work, and received the best critics of the industry after her unique and original interpretation of Lili. That year she also received the Miami Life Award in Best Female Protagonist category for her extraordinary performance as Clemencia in Sacrificio de mujer. It was that year, when De Sousa returned to Televisa under the hand of producer Nicandro Díaz González in the telenovela Amores verdaderos as an antagonist of the story, due to the success of her character in the telenovela, she won the prize as Best Antagonist in a telenovela at the Premios TVyNovelas. In 2013, she joined the cast of the play Perfume de Gardenia, produced by Omar Suárez. She also appeared in the fourth season of reality show ¡Mira quién baila!, being in third place. In 2014, De Sousa got her first lead on Televisa, in the telenovela Hasta el fin del mundo,  first paired with Pedro Fernández, who left the project due to supposed problems with De Sousa, and David Zepeda took the place of Fernández. After Hasta el fin del mundo, she participated in 2016 in Juan Osorio's telenovela, Sueño de amor, in which only as a guest star appeared. After being absent from television for one year, in 2017 she signed an exclusive contract with the Spanish-language television network Telemundo. The network began filming the telenovela Al otro lado del muro, alongside Litzy that debut on 21 February 2018.

In October 2020, De Sousa Participated on the Reality Show of the Spanish Version of Masked Singer, ¿Quién es la máscara? on the 2nd Season as a Banana, and was eliminated on the 2nd Episode.

Personal life
De Sousa married to Venezuelan actor Ricardo Álamo in 2004 and divorced in 2006. In 2016, she had a romantic relationship with Argentine-born Puerto Rican actor Julián Gil with whom she had her first son name Matías Gregorio Gil de Sousa, the relationship between De Sousa and Gil ended in 2017 in unfavorable terms.

Filmography

Awards and nominations

References

External links

 

1980 births
21st-century Venezuelan actresses
21st-century Venezuelan women singers
Actresses from Caracas
Living people
Venezuelan expatriates in Mexico
Venezuelan female models
Venezuelan film actresses
Venezuelan people of Portuguese descent
Venezuelan stage actresses
Venezuelan telenovela actresses
Venezuelan women singers